Brian Keane (born January 18, 1953) is a multi Emmy and Grammy award-winning American composer, music producer, and guitarist. Keane has been described as "a musician's musician, a composer's composer, and one of the most talented producers of a generation" by Billboard magazine.

Keane grew up in Westport, Connecticut, and started his career as a guitarist, eventually touring and recording in a duo with Larry Coryell. Best known as a composer, Keane's first music score for a documentary came in 1980 with Against Wind and Tide: A Cuban Odyssey, which was nominated for an Academy Award. As the cable television business bloomed in the 1980s, Keane quickly became one of the foremost pioneers in documentary music scoring. By the 1990s The Hollywood Reporter respectfully called him "the John Williams of the documentary".

Keane has worked with every major network, and many multi award-winning filmmakers including Barry Levinson, Ric Burns, Susan Lacy, Henry Hampton, Stephen King, and Thomas Lennon, scoring some of the most memorable documentaries in television history such as the epic Burns history of New York in New York: A Documentary Film, the inspiring story of the 1980 Olympic hockey team in Do You Believe in Miracles? and The Battle Over Citizen Kane. Keane also pioneered a new approach to scoring sports programming with his innovative Emmy winning work for HBO and ESPN, and created the music for the groundbreaking ABC News Turning Point in the early days of prime-time documentaries. In addition, Brian has scored the music to several feature films, his music catalog is licensed by most major entertainment companies, and his music is performed all over the world.

It was a soundtrack release of his score to the 1987 documentary Süleyman the Magnificent that would launch Keane's career as a Grammy winning world music producer. That score revolutionized Middle Eastern music and launched the career of Omar Faruk Tekbilek. Keane would become a leading producer of world music in the 1980s and 1990s after that, working with artists as diverse as Linda Ronstadt, Pete Seeger, Joanie Madden, Taj Mahal, Michael Hedges, Buckwheat Zydeco, Yomo Toro, Cyrus Chestnut, David Darling, John Sebastian, Arlo Guthrie and The Clancy Brothers. Keane won a Grammy Award for his 1998 soundtrack Long Journey Home: The Irish in America with the Chieftains, Van Morrison, and Elvis Costello, among others. He has received several other Grammy nominations as well. Brian produced more than 150 records in his career, 37 of which were Billboard Top Ten charting.

With a career spanning well over 40 years, scoring over 700 film and television shows, garnering six Academy Awards, nine Peabody Awards, and over 70 Emmy Awards (18 of which won Emmys for Best Documentary or Series), as well as numerous other awards, Keane has received four Emmy Awards for music, and 20 Emmy nominations. He is the recipient of the New York Festivals TV & Film Awards Grand Award, and was inducted into the New England Music Hall of Fame in 2021.

Biography

Early life 
Keane was born January 18, 1953, in Philadelphia. His mother, Winifred Keane, is an avant garde composer, and his father George F. Keane, while being a successful business man, was also an Irish tenor. Keane's brother, Geoffrey Keane, and his sister, Sheila Keane, are both musical as well. Keane grew up in Westport, Connecticut and played his first professional job as a rock n' roll musician when he was still a sixth grader. He studied privately with the late jazz pianist and Juilliard educator John Mehegan, and then with Czech composer Karel Husa at both Ithaca College, and Cornell where he attended school.

Professional career

Guitarist 

Keane began his professional career as a guitarist playing in clubs and as a sideman, and eventually became a world-renowned jazz guitarist, performing with many Jazz greats of the 1970s and 1980s, including touring worldwide and recording for several years in a guitar duo with Larry Coryell, and eventually becoming a Blue Note recording artist. Brian played on hundreds of records, commercials and film scores as a guitarist beginning in the 1970s and has performed or recorded as a guitarist with artists as diverse as disco singer Vicki Sue Robinson, entertainer Eartha Kitt, the rock group Wishbone Ash, jazz bassist Eddie Gómez, jazz fusion group Spyro Gyra, flamenco guitarist Paco de Lucía, blues artist Taj Mahal, cajun icon Buckwheat Zydeco, classical clarinetist Richard Stoltzman, jazz saxophonist Marion Meadows, folk legend Pete Seeger, singers Linda Ronstadt, Bobby McFerrin, The Clancy Brothers, John Sebastian, and many others.

Composer and record producer

1980s 
In the late 1970s, still making his living primarily as a guitarist, Keane met film directors Jim Burroughs and Suzanne Bauman, while working in his childhood friend Gary Scovil's recording studio in Norwalk, Connecticut.  In 1981, Keane scored his first documentary for them, Against Wind and Tide: A Cuban Odyssey, which was nominated for an Academy Award for best documentary in 1982. That early success led to several more scoring opportunities for Keane in the 1980s, an era where few documentaries were scored with original music. Keane's prominence as a composer rose quickly, even as he continued to tour as a guitarist in a duo with Larry Coryell, and eventually as a solo artist with the release of his first solo CD Snowfalls in 1986. In 1987, Keane's score to the documentary Suleyman the Magnificent, was discovered by German publisher Eckart Rahn who heard the documentary on television, and decided to release a soundtrack CD of Keane's score on his Celestial Harmonies label. The record, among the first to harmonize traditional Middle Eastern music, would form the first of a series of enduring and culturally important collaborations with Middle Eastern musician Omer Faruk Tekbilek, and the success of that CD would eventually lead to Brian becoming a prominent producer of ethnic and New Age recordings, both for Celestial Harmonies and a variety of major record labels.

In 1989, Keane scored the music to Chimps: So Like Us, the HBO Academy Award-nominated and Emmy-winning documentary that helped introduce the public to naturalist Jane Goodall. The film was made by Oscar-winning directors Kirk Simon and Karen Goodman whose New York offices happened to be in the same building, one floor down, from the acclaimed filmmaker Ric Burns. After producing the classic Civil War mini series with his brother Ken Burns in the late 1980s, the highest rated television documentary series in history, Burns went on to work with Keane on the 1990 award-winning documentary Coney Island. Keane has scored every one of Burns' award-winning films ever since, and their ongoing collaborations span three decades. By the end of the 1980s, Keane had already established himself as the leading pioneer in scoring documentary films with The Hollywood Reporter calling him "the John Williams of the documentary".

1990s 
The early 1990s saw Keane's composing career rise dramatically in stature with the multiple-award-winning General Motors' Playwright's Theatre series for Nederlander television, which ran for four years on A&E, the Emmy- and Columbia Dupont-winning miniseries The Great Depression and The War on Poverty for the prominent film maker Henry Hampton, the highly influential Ric Burns documentary The Donner Party which won a Peabody in 1992, and the Emmy- and Peabody-winning film The Battle of the Bulge, for Oscar-winning director Thomas Lennon. Keane scored many award-winning films for the PBS history series American Experience, working with producer Judy Crichton, directors Carl Charlson, Ben Loeterman, Mark Zwonitzer and others. He also scored several award-winning specials for National Geographic working with director Oren Jacoby, and again with the Simon and Goodman picture company. In addition, he was hired by ABC News in the early 1990s to be the composer for the first prime-time, hour-long, news documentary series Turning Point. Working with producers Rudy Bednar and Betsy West, Turning Point would become the first of several news documentary series he scored for ABC News in the 1990s, and the musical approach developed for ABC News has been adopted in many subsequent news documentary series. Because of demand, Keane began hiring orchestrators, many of whom would go on to become successful in their own right like Michael Bacon, Richard Fiocca, Don Grady, Michael Terry and others.

Keane's prominence as a record producer was also rising with the release of the critically acclaimed and commercially successful early 1990s albums: Tibetan Bells: The Empty Mirror for Celestial, Firedance, and Beyond the Sky with Omar Faruk Tekbilek, John Boswell's Festival of the Heart, Celtic Twilight for Hearts of Space, and Song of the Irish Whistle featuring Irish whistler Joanie Madden among others. In 1992, Keane produced the Grammy nominated comedy album You're Good Enough, You're Smart Enough, and Doggone It, People Like You featuring the comic, turned United States senator, Al Franken. Also in 1992, following the success of Keane's production of jazz saxophonist Nelson Rangell's CD for GRP Records, working with executive producers Dave Wilkes and Danny Weiss, he was signed by the music executive Bruce Lundvall, and became a Blue Note recording artist with his debut release of "Common Planet". However, despite the successful debut of "Common Planet", Brian resigned from his career as a recording artist. By that point, he was the father of young children and already in demand as a record producer and composer. He would let go of his career as a touring guitarist from that point on, but continue to record as a guitarist on records and soundtracks.

By the mid-1990s Keane was firmly established as a leading composer in documentary film, and a prominent producer of ethnic and new-age music simultaneously. The later 1990s brought Keane widespread success as a record producer with over three dozen Billboard charting albums for Windham Hill Records, RCA, Sony, Hearts of Space, and other record labels. Keane produced several successful Windham Hill records including the Billboard chart topping CDs Carols of Christmas, Thanksgiving, and several CDs in the hugely popular Winter Solstice and Summer Solstice series. Keane also signed Sean Harkness (a former guitar student) to a deal with Windham Hill and produced several critically acclaimed ethnic records including: Via Jo and Afrika Wassa for Senegalese artist Vieux Diop, and Este Es Mi Mariachi featuring Linda Ronstadt and Mariachi Cobre. In addition, he became well established in producing prominent Irish artists including several RCA records for the female Irish traditional group Cherish The Ladies, Riverdance fiddling sensation Eileen Ivers, and others. In 1998, Brian collaborated with Chieftains founder Paddy Moloney composing and producing the music for the Disney and PBS joint production Long Journey Home: The Irish in America. The RCA soundtrack, featuring the Chieftains, Van Morrison, Elvis Costello, and others, won the Grammy Award for Best Traditional Folk Album in 1999.

In 1997, Keane started working with Hollywood agent Bruce Teitell, and scored several feature films including The Vernon Johns Story: Road to Freedom with James Earl Jones; Stephen King's The Night Flier for New Line Cinema, and Illtown for director Nick Gomez. He continued scoring documentaries as well, with the award-winning Burns mini series and Shanachie double CD soundtrack The Way West, Thomas Lennon's Oscar-nominated and Peabody Award-winning The Battle Over Citizen Kane, the award-winning PBS Nova series A Science Odyssey, and more award-winning American Experience documentaries for its new executive producer Margaret Drain. American Experience won Primetime Emmy Awards for Outstanding Non-Fiction Series in both 1998 and 1999. Also in 1999, Brian scored the multiple Emmy-winning Ric Burns series New York: A Documentary Film which, after the World Trade Center attack of September 11, 2001, became among the biggest selling documentary series of its time.

In 1996, Keane was asked to score Spirit of the Games, a documentary on the Olympics by Emmy-winning director George Roy for HBO Sports. It began a long relationship with HBO Sports and a very successful run of sports documentaries including the Peabody-winning films Babe Ruth, Ali Frazier: One Nation Divisible, Dare to Compete and Fists of Freedom, which were part of a new series of documentaries entitled Sports of the 20th Century. Keane also scored HBO's Inside the NFL during that period.

2000s 
By the year 2000, Napster and other downloading entities were beginning to take over record distribution, and several long established record companies went out of business. In the space of just a year, the record producing business that Keane had enjoyed and accumulated over the previous decade and a half collapsed, along with most record companies. He was still among the most widely recognized composers for documentary film however, and by then, he had extended his notoriety to become a leading composer in the world of sports. In addition to continuing to score Emmy-winning documentaries like Ric Burns' Ansel Adams, Bill Moyers' Becoming American: The Chinese Experience collaborating with Chinese musician George Gao, and several more award-winning American Experience episodes for its new executive producer Mark Samels, Keane composed the music to many classic Emmy- and Peabody-winning HBO sports documentaries in the early 2000s. These included Do You Believe in Miracles, Legendary Nights, Picture Perfect, The Curse of the Bambino and Nine Innings From Ground Zero. He worked with producer Ross Greenburg, directors George Roy, Joe Lavine, and other Emmy-winning sports documentarians, and composed a number of Emmy-nominated and Peabody-winning films for ESPN as well such as Kentucky Bluegrass Basketball, The Complete Angler, You Write Better Than You Play, and David Halberstam's Teammates for directors Fritz Mitchell, Johnson McKelvey, Neil Leifer, and others. Brian also scored several documentary specials for CBS Sports including Pistol Pete, for which he won a music Emmy for his collaborative score with Cajun musician Buckwheat Zydeco. 

In 2001, Keane became the first, and only composer in the history of the Emmys, to sweep all the Emmy nominations for music composition in a single year, and he won Emmys in 2002, 2003, and 2004 for music composition as well. In 2005, he had three more Emmy nominations for music composition, and scored all five Emmy nominated films for best sports documentary that year, including the best documentary Emmy-winning Rhythm in the Rope for ESPN. In 2006, Keane scored Thomas Lennon and Ruby Yang's The Blood of Yingzhou District, which won an Academy Award for Best Documentary: Short Subject. In addition, he scored the Emmy- and Peabody-winning Ric Burns' films Andy Warhol for American Masters and Eugene O'Neil for American Experience. In 2007, Brian received Emmy nominations for his scores to HBO's Barbaro, Mickey Mantle and Johnson McKelvey's Kabul Girls Club. In addition, Keane's compositions were being used in several major feature films, and being adapted for symphony orchestras throughout the world, including the London Symphony Orchestra, The Istanbul State Symphony Orchestra, The Boston Pops Orchestra, and the Colorado Symphony Orchestra.

Keane enjoyed a nonstop series of successes in the entertainment business for over two decades, but by 2008, the era of reality TV, digital media, and multi channel cable television was coming of age. The high end documentary was falling out of favor due to the expense of making them. A 2007 writer's strike crippled the film and television industry, budgets for live musicians were becoming a thing of the past, and the abundance of new cable channels meant smaller budgets and lower standards. Emmy judging was no longer monitored and, although he continued to score Emmy nominated films like Ric Burns' Into the Deep for American Experience, HBO's Joe Louis: A Hero Betrayed, and The Running Rebels of UNLV, as well as the 2011 Academy Award nominated documentary The Warrior of Quigang, Keane decided to work less.

2010s 
In 2012, after scoring Death and the Civil War, which won the Erik Barnauw Award and received an Emmy nomination for Outstanding Non-Fiction Program, Keane got a call from Oscar-winning director Barry Levinson to score the BBC America television series Copper about an Irish policeman, set in 1864 New York. The Levinson Fontana produced series debuted as the highest rated series in the history of BBC America, and garnered Keane another Primetime Emmy Award nomination for Outstanding Main Title Music. Copper was renewed for a second season in 2013, with the soundtrack, Copper: Original Soundtrack, released via Valley Entertainment.

Beginning in 2014, Keane returned to a "semi-retired" schedule. He launched his music library ScoreToPicture.com which was leased to several networks and movie studios.  He continued scoring more Emmy award-winning shows for ESPN, including Fritz Mitchell's It's Time, which garnered Keane his 20th Emmy nomination for music, and worked on several other projects including the unusual festival film Enquiring Minds about the history of the National Enquirer, a commission to compose music for the 75th anniversary of the American Ballet Theatre, the joint BBC and PBS special of The Pilgrims, a world music symphony commission resulting in finishing his first symphony A Speck of Time (which was actually mostly written in 1984). He also produced an early music soundtrack to the 1922 Douglas Fairbanks Sr. silent film of Robin Hood, and composed the score to an important film about racism and American history called The Chinese Exclusion Act. In 2018 Keane returned to sports with the 12-hour series Saturdays in the South for ESPN, which won two New York Festival Gold awards. In 2019, he scored a debut feature documentary for the new Disney+ streaming service called One Day At Disney, and Very Ralph, a documentary biopic about Ralph Lauren, which won the New York Festival's Grand Award for its music score. Also in 2019, Brian scored the music to Oliver Sacks: His Own Life, which debuted to sellout crowds at the Telluride and New York Film Festivals in 2019, was the Audience Favorite Award-winner at the Hampton Film Festival and the Sarasota Film Festival, and went on to earn a "100% Fresh" rating on Rotten Tomatoes from both audiences and critics alike.

Keane also returned to performing on guitar occasionally in 2017 following the death of his one time duo partner Larry Coryell, playing numerous tribute concerts at first, and eventually playing a wide variety of concerts, selling out Carnegie Hall in April 2018 with Omar Faruk Tekbilek, and touring internationally again, after almost 35 years, in 2019.

2020s
In 2020, Keane helped make a film about his long-time friend and accomplished guitarist Charlie Karp. The documentary features a concert he produced in Charlie's honor, and is called Charlie and Us: The Charlie Karp Story. Keane also scored a critically hailed two-hour PBS special documentary by film maker Gretchen Sorin, working with Ric Burns, called Driving While Black. The film aired about the same time that Oliver Sacks: His Own Life was released, due to the Coronavirus delay, and both soundtracks were released by Valley Entertainment. In 2021, Brian was inducted into the New England Music Hall of Fame. In the same year, he scored a 3-hour documentary, Dante Alighieri and his Divine Comedy, for Italian broadcast, produced by Steeplechase Films.

In addition to performing some concerts, Keane continues to work on composing music with his long time engineer Jeff Frez-Albrecht, helping out promising musicians with their music, and occasionally making appearances as a guest lecturer for universities and film festivals. Many of Brian's former employees, interns, and students have gone on to substantial careers of their own.

Personal life 

Keane's studio is located in his first home in Monroe, CT which he bought in 1985, and converted into a recording studio in 1993. He married Susan St. Louis in 1987, who had a son, Chris Laskowski, born in 1971. They had their first son, Wylder, in 1987 and a second son, Dylan, in 1988. They lived at first in the studio they called "Little Big Feet Studios", after which the family moved to Newtown in 1994. Following his divorce in 2010, Keane commuted to the studio from Newtown for 15 years but eventually moved back in 2009. He has shared his home with actress, theatre producer and former high school classmate Bonnie Housner Erickson since 2015. Although he toured throughout the world in his early career as a guitarist, most of Keane's composing career has taken place at his studio in the woods of Connecticut, near friends that he has known for over sixty years in some cases. In an era where most television and film production took place in New York or Los Angeles, he was able to develop his substantial career simply through the notoriety and emotional power of his music.

Award-winning / nominated films scored By Brian Keane

Emmy Awards (composer)

Grammy Awards (music producer)

Soundtrack releases

Select discography (music producer)

References

External links

AllMusic
Music from the hearts of Space
PBS.org
Valley Entertainment
Amazon
"Composer Brian Keane Scores Three Sports Emmy Nominations". Mix. April 12, 2002.
Client Feature: Brian Keane Talks Innovation, Persistence, and Entrepreneurship in Multimedia Scoring: SourceAudio
Loria, Keith (July 20, 2021). "Award-winning composer Brian Keane has mastered the art of the documentary". Connecticut Magazine.
Brian Keane: "Driving While Black": laptrinhx.com
Steinberg,	Jessica (November 20, 2019). "Oud Festival musicians reunite on Jerusalem stage". The Times of Israel.
Dekel, Ayelet (November 24, 2019). "Omar Faruk Tekbilek with Brian Keane – Nazareth Concert". Midnight East.

American television composers
American film score composers
Living people
1953 births
People from Newtown, Connecticut
People from Monroe, Connecticut